The Best Disco... Ever! is a compilation album released by EMI in 2007. It contains songs by international artists.

Track listing

CD 1
The Pointer Sisters- "I'm So Excited"
Village People- "Y.M.C.A."
The Rubettes- "Sugar Baby Love"
KC & The Sunshine Band- "That's the Way (I Like It)"
Gloria Gaynor- "I Will Survive"
Earth, Wind & Fire- "September"
Quincy Jones- "Ai No Corrida"
Donna Summer- "Love to Love You"
Barry White- "You're the First, the Last, My Everything"
The Weather Girls- "It's Raining Men"
Hot Chocolate- "You Sexy Thing"
Brass Construction- "Movin'"
First Choice- "Armed & Extremely Dangerous"
Sister Sledge- "We Are Family"
Diana Ross- "I'm Coming Out"
Barry Manilow- "Copacabana"
Cheryl Lynn- "Got to Be Real"
The Hues Corporation- "Rock The Boat"
George Clinton- "Atomic Dog"

CD 2
Kool & The Gang- "Get Down on It"
Gibson Brothers- "Cuba"
Michael Zager- "Let's All Chant"
Rose Royce- "Car Wash"
Candi Staton- "Young Hearts Run Free"
Tavares- "Heaven Must Be Missing an Angel"
The Trammps- "Disco Inferno"
Dan Hartman- "Instant Replay"
Ottawan- "D.I.S.C.O."
Chic- "Le Freak"
Labelle- "Lady Marmalade"
Maze feat. Frankie Beverly- "Joy And Pain" (Live In New Orleans)
Amii Stewart- "Knock On Wood"
Patrice Rushen- "Forget Me Nots"
A Taste of Honey- "Boogie Oogie Oogie"
Jimmy Bo Horne- "Spank"
Carl Douglas- "Kung Fu Fighting"
Chaka Khan- "Ain't Nobody"
Anita Ward- "Ring My Bell"

CD 3
Bananarama- "Venus"
Boney M- "Daddy Cool"
B3- "Night Fever"
Murray Head- "One Night In Bangkok"
Army of Lovers- "Crucified"
Kool & the Gang- "Celebration"
George McCrae- "Rock Your Baby"
Blondie- "Heart of Glass"
Little Eva- "Locomotion"
Belle Epoque- "Black Is Black"
The Whispers- "And the Beat Goes On"
Imagination- "Just an Illusion"
Odyssey- "Going Back to My Roots"
Soundalikes- "Stayin' Alive" (Tribute To The Bee Gees)
Donna Summer- "Hot Stuff"
Viola Willis- "Gonna Get Along Without You Now"
Marvin Gaye- "Got to Give It Up"

CD 4
Ryan Paris- "Dolce Vita"
Londonbeat- "I've Been Thinking About You"
MC Hammer- "U Can't Touch This"
Haddaway- "What Is Love"
Corona- "Rhythm of the Night"
Culture Beat- "Mr. Vain"
La Bouche- "Be My Lover"
Whigfield- "Saturday Night"
Baltimora- "Tarzan Boy"
Dr Alban- "It's My Life"
Modern Talking- "You're My Heart, You're My Soul"
Sabrina- "Boys"
Sandra- "In the Heat of the Night"
Culture Club- "Karma Chameleon"
Kajagoogoo- "Too Shy"
Erasure- "Take a Chance on Me"
Soft Cell- "Tainted Love"

External links
 album description (in Polish)

Disco
2007 compilation albums
Disco compilation albums
EMI Records compilation albums